CronLab Limited is a privately held limited company which provides information security web filtering software to businesses and the public either directly or via integration into third party products.

CronLab has offices in London, United Kingdom and Gothenburg, Sweden.

History 
CronLab was founded in Gothenburg, Sweden and introduced its first Anti-Spam Hardware Appliances in 2009.

CRN Magazine, and SC Magazine,
In 2010, the company moved its headquarters to London, United Kingdom. It has also released software as a service hosted models of the spam filtering technology awarded a recommendation by Techworld, 
and hosted email archiving solutions.

CIDE Group, a toy manufacturer, partnered with CronLab on development of a children's tablet computer. The tablet, called "Kurio", features CronLab's hosted web-filtering and parental controls technology.
CronLab has agreements for distribution in France, Belgium, Switzerland, Germany, Norway, Bulgaria, Moldova, Romania, Ireland and the United Kingdom.

The company's security products aim to protect against email and web threats such as spam, spyware, trojans and viruses, and they also provide an email archiving solution. 
CronLab's products support multi-tenancy and are marketed to ISPs, MSPs and IT consultants. Their products can all also be white labelled.

References 

Software companies established in 2009
Companies based in Gothenburg
Software companies of Sweden
Computer security software companies
Privately held companies of Sweden
Computer security companies
Content-control software
Swedish companies established in 2009